Melanie McFadyean is a British journalist and lecturer. She has written for a wide range of papers, including The Guardian, The Observer, The Sunday Times and The Independent, particularly about social injustice, immigration and asylum.

Career
McFadyean holds BA (first-class) and MA degrees in English from Leeds University, and after leaving university taught art and then English in Hackney, London. She served as an agony aunt for Just Seventeen magazine on its launch in 1983.

After time spent in Northern Ireland, she co-wrote with Roisin McDonough and Melanie McFadyean a 1984 book, Only The Rivers Run Free: Northern Ireland, the Women's War, described by The Women's Review of Books as "passionate, compelling and absolutely necessary". She also co-wrote, with Margaret Renn, Thatcher's Reign: A Bad Case of the Blues (1984), then published a collection of short stories entitled Hotel Romantika in 1986, for the Virago Press Upstarts imprint for teenagers.

As a journalist, McFadyean has worked at The Guardian and gone on to freelance in radio and television, and in printfor such papers and journals as The Observer, The Sunday Times, The Daily Telegraph, London Review of Books, Granta, The Independent, and The Oldie. The focus of much of her journalism has been refugees and asylum seekers, and spoken of being initially inspired by her own family story: "My mother was a refugee from Nazi Germany. She escaped but she had an aunt and an uncle who didn't, so I grew up with it, knowledge of refugees. But the thing that got me in to it was someone rang me up and asked if I had heard this story about children disappearing.... I have worked as a teacher, as an agony aunt and always had an affiliation with children and the idea that they were going missing…"

McFadyean was consultant producer on the documentary film Guilty by Association, broadcast on BBC One on 7 July 2014. She worked on a Channel 4 documentary, The Lost Boy, about a missing child, Ben Needham. Her radio work includes a six-part BBC Radio 4 series on couples who have been together for three decades (Thirty Years and More) and a programme about the controversial child diarist Opal Whiteley.

For 14 years from 2001 she was a lecturer in investigative journalism at City University's journalism department. She went on to study for an MA in conflict resolution in divided societies, at King's College London.

Awards
In 2001 McFadyean won a media award from Amnesty International for a piece about unaccompanied asylum-seeking children that was published in Guardian Weekend, and has since served on their panel of judges.

Her work as part of an investigation into the law of "joint enterprise" resulted in a report for The Bureau of Investigative Journalism that won the Bar Council Legal Reporting Award 2014.

Personal life
McFadyean is married to Malcolm Blair. Her mother, Marion Guttman, was a Jewish refugee from Nazi Germany who came to England in 1937, and McFadyean's father, international lawyer Colin McFadyean, was a Royal Navy Volunteer Reserve in World War II who was later recruited by Ian Fleming to Naval Intelligence. Her parents were married from 1940 until 1960, after which her father married Mary Malcolm. Mcfadyean has written about the struggles faced by her father in later life to cope with her stepmother's dementia. McFadyean wrote in The Guardian of her own experience of breast cancer.

Bibliography

Books
With Eileen Fairweather and Roisin McDonough: Only the Rivers Run Free: Northern Ireland: The Women's War, Pluto Press, 1984, .
With Margaret Renn: Thatcher's Reign: A Bad Case of the Blues, Chatto & Windus, 1984, 
Hotel Romantika & Other Stories, Virago Upstarts, 1987, 
Drugs Wise: A Practical Guide for Concerned Parents About the Use of Recreational Drugs: A Practical Guide for Concerned Parents About the Use of Illegal Drugs, Icon Books, 1997,

Selected articles
"More fumble than fun", The Independent, 15 September 1996
"Land of the strange", The Observer, 15 August 1999
"Accidental tourists", The Observer, 14 May 200
"Human traffic", The Guardian, 9 March 2001
"Kitchen sink drama", The Guardian, 2 April 2002
"Hard labour", The Guardian, 14 September 2002
"A cold shoulder for Saddam's victims", The Guardian, 22 March 2003
"Where am I?", The Guardian, 18 July 2003
"Some kind of asylum", The Guardian, 6 September 2003
"Congratulations – now get out", The Guardian, 12 November 2003
"The legacy of the hunger strikes", The Guardian, 4 March 2006
"Five Houses", Granta, 2 October 2006
"A lapse of humanity", The Guardian, 16 November 2006
"£ ... per incident: suicides in immigration detention", London Review of Books, Vol. 28, No. 22, 16 November 2006
"Relative Values: Kerry Grist and her daughter, Leighanna Needham", The Sunday Times, 23 March 2008
"The lost boy", The Independent, 23 October 2011
"The hunt for Ben Needham and the family that won't give up searching", The Observer, 28 April 2013
"Opinion: 'As I got into the small print of joint enterprise it seemed I had wandered through the looking glass'", The Bureau of Investigative Journalism, 31 March 2014
With  Maeve McClenaghan, Rachel Stevenson and Clare Sambrook: "Guilty of choosing the wrong friends: the relentless injustice of 'joint enterprise'", openDemocracy, 4 July 2014
"Compassion in Care", The Oldie, 13 November 2019

References

External links
Melanie McFadyean profile at The Guardian.
Melanie McFadyean at The Independent.

Living people
20th-century British journalists
21st-century British journalists
20th-century British women writers
21st-century British women writers
British women short story writers
British women non-fiction writers
The Guardian people
Date of birth missing (living people)
British investigative journalists
Academics of City, University of London
Alumni of King's College London
Year of birth missing (living people)
Alumni of the University of Leeds